The men's 100 metre backstroke event for the 1976 Summer Olympics was held in Montreal, Canada. The event took place on 18 and 19 July.

Heats
Heat 1

Heat 2

Heat 3

Heat 4

Heat 5

Heat 6

Semifinals
Heat 1

Heat 2

Final

References

External links
Official Olympic Report

Swimming at the 1976 Summer Olympics
Men's events at the 1976 Summer Olympics